Arbana Osmani (born 7 May 1983) is an Albanian television presenter and radio personality, best known for presenting Big Brother Albania.

Career
She started her career in 2000 as a journalist for "Intervista" magazine. Later she started working for Top Albania Radio, first as a radio presenter for shows like "Top Select" in 2002.

Later she went on working in television on Top Channel, she presented for four seasons the popular show "Top Fest", together with other TV presenters such as Ledion Liço, Xhemi Shehu, Alban Dudushi and Evis Mula. She has also presented other shows like "Pasdite ne Top Channel", "E Diell" ("Sunday"), "1001 Pse?!" ("1001 Why?!"), an entertainment children's show and other shows.

For 7 editions in a row, from 2008 until 2014, Osmani presented Albania's most watched reality show, "Big Brother Albania". In 2013 she confirmed that Big Brother would go on hiatus for a year. She was then working on her cooking book. However, Big Brother returned with a seventh season on 22 February, 2014, with Osmani returning as well as the host of the show. She did not return for the eighth season, due to pregnancy. The main host was Ledion Liço. Osmani returned to the show as a presenter for its ninth season.

In 2015–2016 season, she presented for one season the game show "Ne 1 Jave" ("In 1 Week"). From 29 October, 2016, and for 5 seasons she presented the show "Dua Te Te Bej Te Lumtur" ("I want to make you happy") on Top Channel.

On 17 August, 2021, Osmani announced on her Instagram account that she will be presenting the celebrity version of Big Brother VIP Albania, that began airing on 5 October 2021 on Top Channel. Due to satisfactory ratings of the first season, Top Channel announced a second season of Big Brother VIP, which will begin airing in December 2022, with Osmani being the presenter of the show.

In 2022, Osmani played on the film Sophia, where played herself.

Osmani hosted the 61st edition of the annual Albanian music competition Festivali i Këngës on RTSH.

TV shows
 Top Select (Top Albania Radio)
 Top Fest (Top Channel)
 Pasdite ne Top Channel (Top Channel)
 E Diell (Top Channel)
 1001 Pse?! (Top Channel)
 Big Brother Albania (Top Channel)
 Ne 1 Jave (Top Channel)
 Dua Te Te Bej Te Lumtur (Top Channel)
 Big Brother VIP (Top Channel)
 Festivali i Këngës (RTSH)

Personal life
Osmani was in a relationship with Ardit Kero, who were for 16-years together. They have a son, with the name Joni.

Osmani met director Eduart Grishaj in 2019. They have a son, who was born in 2020 and gave him the name Diell and a daughter, who was born in 2022 and Osmani and Grishaj gave her the name Zoi.

References

Living people
1983 births
People from Dibër (municipality)
20th-century Albanian women
21st-century Albanian women
People from Tirana
Albanian television presenters
Albanian women television presenters
Albanian radio presenters
Albanian women radio presenters
Big Brother (Albanian TV series)